General elections were held in Jordan on 6 July 1963. As political parties were banned at the time, all candidates ran as independents.

References

Elections in Jordan
General election
Jordan
Jordan
Election and referendum articles with incomplete results
Jordan